For the Emperor is a science fiction and military fiction novel written by British author Alex Stewart under the pseudonym of Sandy Mitchell, first published by Black Library in 2003 in paperback form. The novel has since been re-printed in hardback and in several other languages, including French. It is the first title in the Ciaphas Cain series of novels, taking place within the canon of Warhammer 40,000. It follows the eponymous Ciaphas Cain, a Commissar in service to the Imperial Guard's Valhallan 597th Regiment.

The story is presented in the form of Cain's personal memoirs, occasionally interrupted by Inquisitor Amberly Vail's humorous comments in the form of various anecdotes and commentaries, helping to provide additional information for the reader as Cain himself is an unreliable narrator. Other characters' perspectives are also provided, such as extracts from Sulla's (a Guardswoman of the 597th) own memoirs and official Imperial texts.

Plot

Commissar Ciaphas Cain, a famed member of the Imperial Guard, and his aide-de-camp Gunner First Class Jurgen are transferred to the Valhallan 296th-301st, a composite Guard unit in transit aboard a spaceship, formed from the remnants of the Valhallan 296th and 301st Regiments after both sustained grievous losses. He is introduced to Colonel Kasteen and Major Broklaw, the highest-ranking officers from both regiments. Cain discovers that tensions between the members of the two regiments are rising rapidly due to clashing centuries-old traditions. The tension comes to a head when a riot breaks out in a mess hall, with multiple casualties within the both regiments and the ship's crew.

With some luck and wit, Cain manages to defuse the situation, placating the angered ship crew and forging new unity between the Guardsmen of the Valhallan 597th, formed from the merger of the 296th and 301st. Members of the 597th responsible for the riot are sentenced to undertake suicide missions in the future.

Some time later, the 597th are assigned to the backwater planet of Gravalax as a show of force since the planet's locals have begun to defect to the Tau, a race of expansionist aliens. At a diplomatic event organised by Planetary Governor Grice, a Tau diplomat is assassinated, causing tensions to rise. Nearly immediately after, conflict breaks out across the capital, with civilian rioters and Planetary Defence Force troops fighting against and on the side of both Imperial and Tau forces. Cain and Lord General Zyvan are able to discover the presence of a conspiracy on Gravalax to initiate conflict between the Tau and the Imperium to unknown ends. During an operation to suppress the chaos, Cain and the convicted members of the 597th are recruited by Ordo Xenos Inquisitor Amberly Vail to go on a reconnaissance mission to the underground depths of Gravalax's capital city to uncover the conspiracy, where they join forces with a Tau unit.

Underground, they encounter a Genestealer Cult, confirming Vail's suspicions. Kelp, one of the convicted Guardsmen, attempts to kill Cain, but is killed by Jurgen. Another, Trebek, is killed after being shot in the chest by Genestealer cultists. Two of the convicted, Holenbi and Velade, are separated from the rest in an intense firefight. However, Jurgen is able to kill the leader of the Genestealer cultists, the Patriarch, throwing the remaining cultists into chaos, thus giving the group the chance to escape above-ground into Grice's palace. Grice shoots and kills Sorel, the last convicted Guardsman. He reveals himself as another Genestealer cultist and the assassin of the Tau diplomat, and engages the group in combat. Vail lands the killing blow, and the group is evacuated by the 597th.

After the battle, a dazed Holenbi and Velade are retrieved by a search team with little memory of their time separated from Cain, but Cain summarily executes them both with his sidearm. He uses a knife to remove a Genestealer implant in Holenbi's body, with Vail explaining to a sickened Kasteen and Sulla that both had been infected by Genestealers, made obvious by their disappearance, disorientation and missing memory after combat against Genestealers. Kasteen orders their bodies incinerated. Cain and Vail observe Tau soldiers exhibiting the symptoms of Genestealer infection being led away.

Soon after, the Tau mysteriously leave Gravalax behind, returning Gravalax to Imperial hands. Vail and Cain discuss the incident over a meal, where they discuss the ongoing extermination of local Genestealer cults; she also reveals Jurgen's nature as a psychic blank to Cain. The two toast to their friendship, and Vail promises to keep in touch with Cain.

References

Bibliography
Stewart, Alex. For the Emperor: A Ciaphas Cain Novel. Black Library, 2003.

2003 British novels
2003 science fiction novels
British science fiction novels
Warhammer 40,000 novels